Macrocoma janthina is a species of leaf beetle found in Tanzania and the Democratic Republic of the Congo. It was first described by Léon Fairmaire from Tabora in 1887.

References 

janthina
Beetles of Africa
Beetles of the Democratic Republic of the Congo
Insects of Tanzania
Beetles described in 1887
Taxa named by Léon Fairmaire